Wattle Glen is a suburb of Melbourne, Victoria, Australia, 25 km north-east of Melbourne's Central Business District, located within the Shire of Nillumbik local government area.

The nearest public libraries are Diamond Valley Library and Eltham Library and the mobile library which stops at Hurstbridge operated by Yarra Plenty Regional Library.

History

The Post Office opened on 1 November 1901 as Diamond Creek Upper, was renamed Wattle Glen on 1 November 1922, and closed on 4 April 1975. When the railway line arrived in 1912 the railway station was named Balee on 25 June. This was renamed Wattleglen (as one word) on 14 August 1922.

Its popular meet and greet spot is the local general store, which was built and opened in 1988. The original general store was burnt down in the early 1900s and was located across the road from this one. Locals also gather at the Wattle Glen Cricket Club.

Wattle Glen is a small town wedged between suburbia, Diamond Creek, and the rural fringes of Hurstbridge. There are few facilities except the Railway Station, General Store, Tennis Club, CFA station, and a scout hall. Wattle Glen has a small primary school known as Wattle Glen Primary School.

See also
 Shire of Diamond Valley – Parts of Wattle Glen were previously within this former local government area.
 Shire of Eltham – Parts of Wattle Glen were previously within this former local government area.

References

Suburbs of Melbourne
Suburbs of the Shire of Nillumbik